June Island is an island in the Debenham Islands lying close southwest of Audrey Island, off the west coast of Graham Land, Antarctica. It was discovered and charted by the British Graham Land Expedition (BGLE), 1934–37, under John Rymill, who named it for a daughter of Frank Debenham, a member of the BGLE Advisory Committee.

See also 
 List of Antarctic and sub-Antarctic islands

References

Islands of Graham Land
Fallières Coast